Austin Yearwood (born August 12, 1994) is an American soccer player who currently plays for New Mexico United in the USL Championship. He operates as a left back or left wing-back.

Career

College and amateur
Yearwood graduated from South Mecklenburg High School in Charlotte, North Carolina. While in high school he was a 2011 NCSCA All-State selection, three-time All-Region, and three-time All-Conference. Yearwood also played in the 2011 ESPNHS All-American game.

He played college soccer at High Point University from 2012 to 2015. While at college, Yearwood also appeared for USL PDL clubs Carolina Dynamo in 2013 and 2014, and Charlotte Eagles in 2015.

Professional
Yearwood signed with United Soccer League side Charlotte Independence on March 31, 2016.

Yearwood signed with Richmond Kickers on December 15, 2017. On November 6, 2018, he signed for USL Championship expansion club New Mexico United. He scored his first professional goal on June 16, 2021, the team's second in a 2-0 win over San Antonio FC.

Career statistics

References

1994 births
Living people
American soccer players
High Point Panthers men's soccer players
North Carolina Fusion U23 players
Charlotte Eagles players
Charlotte Independence players
Richmond Kickers players
Soccer players from Charlotte, North Carolina
USL League Two players
USL Championship players
Association football defenders
New Mexico United players